The Southern Harmony, and Musical Companion is a shape note hymn and tune book compiled by William Walker, first published in 1835. The book is notable for having originated or popularized several hymn tunes found in modern hymnals and shape note collections like The Sacred Harp.

The music and its notation 

The roots of Southern Harmony singing, like the Sacred Harp, are found in the American colonial era, when singing schools convened to provide instruction in choral singing, especially for use in church services. This practice remained popular with Baptists in the South long after it fell from use in other regions.

In 1801, a book called The Easy Instructor by William Smith and William Little was published for the use of this movement; its distinguishing feature was the use of four separate shapes that indicated the notes according to the rules of solfege.  A triangle indicated fa, a circle sol, a square la and a diamond, mi.  To avoid proliferating shapes excessively, each shape (and its associated syllable) except for mi was assigned to two notes of the musical scale.  A major scale in the system would be noted Fa – Sol – La – Fa – Sol – La – Mi – Fa, and a minor scale would be La – Mi – Fa – Sol – La – Fa – Sol – La.

History 
The Southern Harmony, and Musical Companion was compiled by William "Singin' Billy" Walker and printed in 1835, with subsequent editions printed in Philadelphia. It contained 335 songs, went through several editions, and became one of the most popular southern tunebooks in the 19th century. In 1867 Walker claimed over 600,000 copies had been sold. Walker added an appendix of additional tunes in 1840 with a further enlargement in 1847. An 1854 revision deleted several tunes and added still more.  The present edition is a facsimile reprint of the 1854 edition.

In 1866, Walker published a tunebook entitled The Christian Harmony, in which he changed from four shape to seven shape notation. He incorporated over half of the contents of The Southern Harmony in the Christian Harmony.  Walker died on September 30, 1887.

The Southern Harmony has remained unchanged since 1854, unlike its counterpart the Sacred Harp, which went through several revisions in the 20th century. About 75% of the songs are presented in three-part harmony.

Besides Walker, notable contributors to Southern Harmony included Matilda T. Durham and John Gill Landrum.

Related
The American composer William Duckworth used some of the songs in the Southern Harmony as a starting point for his own minimalist choral arrangements of the same name.

Composer Donald Grantham also composed a four-movement piece for wind ensemble based on the anthology, entitled Southern Harmony.

The Black Crowes named their second album The Southern Harmony and Musical Companion after this song anthology.

Notes

Bibliography
 .
 .
 .
 .

See also the bibliographic entries under Shape note.

References

External links
 .
 .
 .
 .
 

Shape note
Hymnals
Christian music media
1835 in music
1835 in Christianity
1835 books